Wichita County is the name of the following counties in the United States:
 Wichita County, Kansas
 Wichita County, Texas